B-15 Project are a UK garage duo, originally consisting of members Angus Campbell and Ian Wallman. They are best known for the hit song "Girls Like Us" which peaked at number 7 on the UK Singles Chart in June 2000. DJ/producer Danny Wynn worked with the group from 2007.

Discography

Singles
"Party Time" (with Tony Curtis) (1998)
"Feel My Desire" (1999)
"All the Ladies" (featuring Tippa Irie & Lavine-D) (1999)
"Testify" (vs. Colonel Red) (1999)
"Strawberries"/"Soundboy" (1999)
"Girls Like Us" (featuring Crissy D & Lady G) (2000) – UK #7
"Feels So Good" (featuring Shola Ama & Ms. Dynamite) (2001) – UK #82
"Everyone Falls in Love" (featuring Tanto Metro & Devonte) (2001)
"Games" (featuring Machel Montano) (2002)
"Put Em Up (Bassline Stomp)" (featuring Youngman) (2008)
"Flick It Up" (featuring Hanna C) (2008)
"Everybody Dance" (Danny Wynn vs. B-15 Project featuring Siobhan) (2008)
"Feels So Good (Remix)" (featuring Shola Ama & Ms. Dynamite) (2009)
"Diamonds and Pearls" (B-15 Project featuring McLaren) (2020)

References

UK garage groups
English electronic music groups
British musical trios
Relentless Records artists